The Canterbury and York Society is a British text publication society founded in 1904. It publishes scholarly editions of English medieval (pre-Reformation) ecclesiastical records, notably episcopal registers.

History and activities
The Society was founded in 1904. The genealogist and publisher W.P.W. Phillimore was prominent in its establishment. Its name was taken from those of the two provinces of the Church of England, Canterbury and York; and its joint presidents are the two current Archbishops of Canterbury and York.

It endeavours to publish one volume a year: its 100th volume appeared in 2010. The great majority of its publications are editions of the registers of bishops and archbishops (of which it has published over fifty, some in several volumes); but other types of ecclesiastical record also fall within its remit.

The Society holds an annual meeting, which includes a lecture on an aspect of English church history by a leading scholar.

Membership (individual or institutional) is open to all. In return for an annual subscription, the member receives that year's volume and the right to purchase back volumes at a discount.

Publications

Recent volumes have included:

References

Further reading

External links

1904 establishments in England
Organizations established in 1904
Small press publishing companies
Historical societies of the United Kingdom
Text publication societies
Archives in England
Heritage organisations in the United Kingdom
Learned societies of the United Kingdom
Book publishing companies of England
Church of England societies and organisations
History of Catholicism in England